Archimedes Muzenda  (born 23 August 1991) is the Secretary-General of the African Planning Society. Prior to his appointment as the secretary-general in January 2020, he previously served as the director of African Planning Society from January 2019. Archimedes Muzenda is the inaugural holder of the office after it was established following the merger of African Planning Association with African Urban Community of Practice (AUCoP) an initiative of African Urban Institute to form African Planning Society. His mandate as inaugural secretary-general was outlined at the conference of Association of African Planning Schools in Tanzania.

Early life and education 
Muzenda was born in Harare in 1991. He attended local schools in Zimbabwe and received his undergraduate degree in Regional and Urban planning from University of Zimbabwe in 2014 where is began his career as an urban planning researcher. After working for about a year at African Capacity Building Foundation in Harare, Muzenda pursued graduate studies in Hungary, graduating with a Master of Public Administration from Central European University in 2017.

Books 

 Muzenda, Archimedes (2020). Dystopia: How the Tyranny of  Specialists Fragment African Cities. Harare: African Urban Institute Press.

See also 

 African Planning Society
 Urban planning in Africa
 Secretary-General of the African Planning Society

References

External links 
 Official website of Archimedes Muzenda – APS Secretary-General

Living people
1991 births
University of Zimbabwe alumni
Central European University alumni
Urban planners
People from Harare